Botany in a Day: The Patterns Method of Plant Identification is a book by Thomas J. Elpel published by HOPS Press, LLC. The book emphasizes family characteristics for plant identification. Related plants typically have similar floral features and often similar uses. For example, plants of the mustard family (Brassicaceae) have four petals with six stamens (4 tall, 2 short), and most or all of the 3,200 species are considered edible.

The book is used as a text at universities, high schools, and herbal schools across North America. It is also recommended as a resource for the Nature Merit Badge by the Boy Scouts of America. Although the text is primarily oriented towards North American plants, Botany in a Day has been used to identify plants in Europe, Asia, Africa, Australia, and South America. As of 2010, there were more than 45,000 copies in print.

References

External links
Online Tutorial: Learning to Identify Plants by Families – official site
Learn Plants Now! (Book Review)
Botany Every Day

2004 non-fiction books
American non-fiction books
Botany books